The 2021–22 season was Palermo Football Club's 14th season in the third tier of Italian football and the third season – second in a row – in the unified Serie C. In addition to the domestic league, Palermo participated in this season's edition of the Coppa Italia Serie C after 20 years.

Match legend:
 (H) – Home 
 (A) – Away  
 (N) – Neutral
 (Y) – Yellow cards
 (R) – Red cards

Players

First team squad
Sources: Palermo F.C., SoccerwayYouth sectorPlayers joined First squad during the season.Transfers
In

Out

Pre-season and friendlies
During pre-season Palermo played four friendlies: against Potenza and Monopoli, Serie C Group C clubs, against Salernitana, Serie A club, and against Enna, Eccellenza club. One week before the first official match, Palermo's players composed two teams, Rosa (Pink) and Nero (Black), which faced each other at Stadio Renzo Barbera. It was the first match played in Palermo with attendance since 1 March 2020. Match was played in two halves of 40 minutes each. On January Palermo played a friendly against the sicilian Eccellenza club Oratorio S. Ciro e Giorgio from Marineo, profiting by the long Christmas break due to the postponement of matchdays 21 and 22. On April Palermo played the last friendly of the season against Palermo U-19, in order to celebrate the 2nd place reached by Youth sector in the promotion play-offs for Campionato Primavera 2. This match replaces the canceled Serie C game against Catania due to the exclusion of the other sicilian club from league.

Competitions
OverviewLeague statistics include the away loss against Catania on 12 December 2021.Serie C Group C

League table

Matches

Promotion play-offs

Coppa Italia Serie C

Statistics
Appearances, goals and disciplinary recordSources: Lega Pro, Soccerway, Tuttocalciatori.net, Aic.footballSecond yellow cards are counted as straight red cards.Statistics in round brackets include the away match against Catania on 12 December 2021.''

Goals conceded and clean sheets

Attendances

Notes

References

Palermo F.C. seasons
Palermo